Alpin may refer to:

Alpín mac Echdach, two kings of the same name - one the father of Cináed mac Ailpín, the other a king of Dál Riata
Siol Alpin, a group of seven related Scottish Clans
House of Alpin, a dynasty of Scottish kings
King Alpín I of the Picts 
King Alpín II of the Picts
Metro Alpin, the highest subway in the world in Saas Fee, Switzerland
Alpin (supplement), a weekly supplement of Prothom Alo, a Bangladeshi newspaper
Kimfly Alpin, a Slovenian paraglider design

See also
Alpine (disambiguation)